Miłkowo  is a village in the administrative district of Gmina Lubasz, within Czarnków-Trzcianka County, Greater Poland Voivodeship, in west-central Poland.

References

Villages in Czarnków-Trzcianka County